Margotton is a French surname. Notable people with the surname include:

 Grégoire Margotton (born 1969), French journalist
 René Margotton (1915–2009), French painter

French-language surnames